Elena Bertocchi (born 19 September 1994) is an Italian diver. She competed at the 2015 World Aquatics Championships. She qualified for the 2020 Summer Olympics.

See also
Italy at the 2015 World Aquatics Championships

References

External links
 

Italian female divers
Living people
Place of birth missing (living people)
1994 births
Divers at the 2010 Summer Youth Olympics
World Aquatics Championships medalists in diving
European Championships (multi-sport event) bronze medalists
Divers at the 2020 Summer Olympics
Olympic divers of Italy
Divers from Milan